Phellinus is a genus of fungi in the family Hymenochaetaceae. Many species cause white rot. Fruit bodies, which are found growing on wood, are resupinate, sessile, and perennial. The flesh is tough and woody or cork-like, and brown in color. Clamp connections are absent, and the skeletal hyphae are yellowish-brown.

The name Phellinus means cork.

The species Phellinus ellipsoideus (previously Fomitiporia ellipsoidea) produced the largest ever fungal fruit body.

Phellinus species produce a number of natural chemicals which are of interest to science. These include the natural phenol hispidin, bio-active styrylpyrones called phelligridins, and bio-active isolates called phellinins.

Uses
In Australia, Aborigines have used Phellinus fruit bodies medicinally. The smoke from burning fruit bodies was inhaled by those with sore throats. Scrapings from slightly charred fruit bodies were drunk with water to treat coughing, sore throats, "bad chests", fevers and diarrhoea. There is some uncertainty about which species of Phellinus were used.

Species
, Index Fungorum lists 154 species of Phellinus:

Phellinus acifer
Phellinus acontextus
Phellinus adamantinus
Phellinus adhaerens
Phellinus allardii
Phellinus anchietanus
Phellinus andinopatagonicus
Phellinus andinus
Phellinus apiahynus
Phellinus appositus
Phellinus aureobrunneus
Phellinus baccharidis
Phellinus badius
Phellinus bambusicola
Phellinus bambusinus
Phellinus betulinus
Phellinus bicuspidatus
Phellinus brevisetus
Phellinus carteri
Phellinus caryophylleus
Phellinus caryophylli
Phellinus castanopsidis
Phellinus chocolatus
Phellinus chryseus
Phellinus chrysoloma
Phellinus cinchonensis
Phellinus coffeatoporus
Phellinus conchatus
Phellinus coronadensis
Phellinus crocatus
Phellinus crustosus
Phellinus cyclobalanopsidis
Phellinus cylindrosporus
Phellinus daedaliformis
Phellinus dependens
Phellinus deuteroprunicola
Phellinus dingleyae
Phellinus discipodoides
Phellinus ellipsoideus
Phellinus erectus
Phellinus eugeniae
Phellinus everhartii
Phellinus fastuosus
Phellinus feneus
Phellinus ferrugineovelutinus
Phellinus formosanus
Phellinus fragrans
Phellinus fushanianus
Phellinus gabonensis
Phellinus garuhapensis
Phellinus gilbertsonii
Phellinus gilvus
Phellinus grenadensis
Phellinus griseoporus
Phellinus hartigii
Phellinus himalayensis
Phellinus hoehnelii
Phellinus igniarius
Phellinus incrustaticeps
Phellinus jezoensis
Phellinus kamahi
Phellinus kravtzevii
Phellinus laevigatus
Phellinus lapideus
Phellinus laurencii
Phellinus leiomitus
Phellinus linteus
Phellinus livescens
Phellinus lopezii
Phellinus luctuosus
Phellinus lukinsii
Phellinus lundellii
Phellinus luteofulvus
Phellinus luteus
Phellinus macroferreus
Phellinus macrosporus
Phellinus mangrovicus
Phellinus melanodermus
Phellinus membranaceus
Phellinus merrillii
Phellinus minimus
Phellinus minutiporus
Phellinus mituliformis
Phellinus montanus
Phellinus mori
Phellinus neocallimorphus
Phellinus neonoxius
Phellinus neoquercinus
Phellinus newtoniae
Phellinus nicaraguensis
Phellinus nilgheriensis
Phellinus nothofagi
Phellinus noxius
Phellinus ossatus
Phellinus overholtsii
Phellinus pachyphloeus
Phellinus palmicola
Phellinus piceinus
Phellinus poeltii
Phellinus pomaceus
Phellinus populicola
Phellinus prunicola
Phellinus pseudoigniarius
Phellinus punctatiformis
Phellinus purpureogilvus
Phellinus pusillus
Phellinus quercinus
Phellinus ralunensis
Phellinus reichingeri
Phellinus repandus
Phellinus resinaceus
Phellinus rhamni
Phellinus rhytiphloeus
Phellinus rickii
Phellinus rimosus
Phellinus robiniae
Phellinus roseocinereus
Phellinus rufus
Phellinus sancti-georgii
Phellinus sanfordii
Phellinus sarcites
Phellinus scleropileatus
Phellinus scorodocarpi
Phellinus semihispidus
Phellinus setulosus
Phellinus shaferi
Phellinus shoushanus
Phellinus sonorae
Phellinus spadiceus
Phellinus spiculosus
Phellinus spinescens
Phellinus subcontiguus
Phellinus sublaevigatus
Phellinus sublamaensis
Phellinus subsanfordii
Phellinus swieteniae
Phellinus syringeus
Phellinus tawhai
Phellinus tenuiculus
Phellinus terminaliae
Phellinus transversus
Phellinus tremulae
Phellinus tricolor
Phellinus tubifragilis
Phellinus turbinatus
Phellinus uncinatus
Phellinus uncisetus
Phellinus velutinus
Phellinus viticola
Phellinus weirianus
Phellinus weirii
Phellinus williamsii
Phellinus zealandicus

References

 
Agaricomycetes genera